Dragomir is a Slavic masculine name, mostly found in Serbia, Slovenia, Croatia, North Macedonia, Bulgaria, Russia, and Ukraine as well as Romania. It is composed of the Slavic words drag (dear, precious) and mir (peace), both very common in Slavic dithematic names. It can be translated as To whom peace is precious, i.e. He who cares about peace. However, the ending mir, found in many Slavic names, has developed from the Old Slavic term *meru which meant 'large, great, greatly'. Thus the original Old Slavic meaning of the name would be He who is very dear or He who is very precious (to his family). The female form of the name is Dragomira (or Drahomíra), Dragomirka and is also very popular.

Notable people
Dragomir Bojanić (1933–1993), Serbian actor, nicknamed Gidra
Dragomir Brajković (1947–2009), Serbian writer, journalist, editor of Radio Belgrade, poet
Dragomir Čumić (born 1937), Serbian actor
Dragomir Dujmov, Serbian poet, novelist and short story writer from Hungary
Dragomir of Duklja (born 1018), ruler of Travunia and Zachlumia
Dragomir Hurmuzescu (1865-1954), Romanian physicist
Dragimir Hvalimirović, Župan of Travunia
Dragomir Jovanović (1902–1946), Serbian politician
Dragomir Markov (born 1971), retired swimmer from Bulgaria
Dragomir Mihajlović, Serbian rock guitarist
Dragomir Milošević (born 1942), Serbian commander and war criminal
Dragomir Nikolić, Serbian football manager
Dragan Okuka (born 1954), Serbian football manager and a former player
Dragomir R. Radev, University of Michigan computer science professor
Dragomir Stankovic (born 1972), Serbian football referee
Dragomir Tošić (1909–1985), Yugoslavian football defender
Dragomir Vukobratović (born 1988), Serbian footballer

As surname
Alexandru Dragomir (1916–2002), Romanian philosopher
Anastase Dragomir (1896–1966), Romanian inventor
Dimitrie Dragomir (born 1884), Bessarabian politician
Dumitru Dragomir, president of the Romanian Professional Football League since 1996
Ioan Dragomir (1905–1985), Romanian bishop of the Greek-Catholic Church
Ionuț Dragomir (born 1974), Romanian football player
Mihu Dragomir (1919-1964), Romanian poet
Ruxandra Dragomir (born 1972), Romanian retired female tennis player

As place name
Dragomir, village in Berzunți Commune, Bacău County, Romania
Dragomir, village in Plovdiv municipality, Bulgaria

See also
Drago (disambiguation)
Dragomiris
Dragomirna (disambiguation)
Dragomirov
Dragomirovo (disambiguation)

External links
http://www.behindthename.com/name/dragomir

Slavic masculine given names
Bulgarian masculine given names
Croatian masculine given names
Macedonian masculine given names
Montenegrin masculine given names
Serbian masculine given names

Romanian masculine given names
Ukrainian masculine given names
Masculine given names
Given names